Krokhino is a former village in Belozersky District of Vologda Oblast. It was located 17 km east of the town of Belozersk on the left bank of the Sheksna River, close to the place it flows out of Lake Beloye.

History 
In the 10th century the city of Beloozero that had been located on the north bank of Lake Beloye, was moved to the source of the Sheksna River. Since 1238 it became the center of the Principality of Beloozero. In 1352 the city was moved 17 km to the west, to its current location.

The village of Krokhino was first mentioned in 1426 in the books of the Kirillo-Belozersky Monastery. It was located at the same place at the source of the Sheksna where the town of Beloozero was formerly located. The village was owned by boyar’s son Gavrila Laptev. In 1434 he died without leaving any heirs, and Krokhino was donated to the Ferapontov Monastery by the prince of Mozhaysk, Ivan Andreyevich. Because of its geographic location, the village became an important trade centre. Most probably, in the 15th century Krokhino already had its own church.

After the Mariinskiy waterway was opened in 1810, both Krokhino, which still belonged to the Ferapontov Monastery, and the neighboring village of Velikolesye owned by the  Kirillo-Belozersky Monastery, became known under the common name of Krokhinskaya Pristan (which means Krokhino Wharf). On the wharf the goods from the ships in the Sheksna River were moved to the lake ships that further sailed to Lake Beloye.

The lake was shallow, and frequent storms made the navigation complicated. Only special boats (belozerka's) could navigate on the lake. The boats were constructed to provide for enhanced stability and durability. The ship manufacturers from Krokhino and Belozersk, who were also boat owners, were gaining big revenues on their monopoly. The town dwellers were employed as pilots and skippers, loaded merchandise or made and sold shipping appliances. Due to this stable source of revenue, Krokhino was growing fast. On November 4, 1777, Krokhinskaya Pristan was renamed into Posad (trading quarter). The Krokhino residents were exempt from their peasant duties and got the same rights as city dwellers. On May 23, 1792 the Town Hall was founded and Krokhino became in fact a non-district (non-uyezd) town.

The Krokhino Posad was situated on the mail path from Belozersk to Vytegra, in 600 versts to Novgorod, in 413 versts by water to the falling of Sheksna River into Volga River near the Rybinsk Wharf. Posad owned lands on the banks of Sheksna River that spanned for 3 versts from Beloozero. The width of the river in these places was 80 to 120 sazhens. The depth was from 4 to 13 quarters. From April to October ships were sailing on the river. On the Posad territory Troitskaya, Kargulka, Mysluga, Gorbovka, Dmitrovka, Nikol'skaya and Borisohlebskaya tributaries were falling into Sheksna River. Bridges were thrown through Troitskaya, Kargulka, Mysluga and Nikol’skaya. There were two acting crossings through Sheksna River – horse and foot crossings.

By the end of the 18th century The Krokhino Posad had four churches. Three of them were made of wood, and one was made of stone and was built in 1788.

In 1846 the Belozersky Canal was built as a way to go around the lake. It started 9 versts (9.5 km) below Krokhino. Krokhinskaya Pristan’ (the Krokhino Dock) got closed and Posad quickly lost its meaning for trade as well as its prosperity. Among local residents there is a legend that land surveyors who were planning the new channel, asked Krokhino dwellers for a bribe. And when they were refused, they have put the channel away from the Posad.

In 1865 Posad consisted of 3 parts: Krokhino (4 blocks), Velikolesye (2 blocks) and Kargulino (3 blocks). The Posad had 13 stone houses and 179 wood houses. There were also shops, barns, coaching inn, 3 forges, 4 pubs, 2 wind mills and 2 water mills. The main occupations of residents were navigation and trade. One third of residents was involved in fishing. There were also people involved in agriculture and shipbuilding. Before 1791 there was an acting parochial school that had 27 students. But because of the lack of funding it got closed down, and children had to get education only privately.

Krokhino and Velikolesye were affiliated to the parish of the Christmas Church. Kargulino was affiliated with Trinity Church that earlier had been part of the monastery. There were 884 residents in Christmas Church parish (406 men and 478 women) and 288 residents in Trinity parish (148 men and 140 women).

In 1961 Sheksna Reservoir that became part of Volga–Baltic Waterway, was filled. After the construction of the 8th lock near Sheksna the water level in Sheksna River have risen by 5 meters and Krokhino turned out to fall into the flooding zone. Старый шлюз был опущен на дно. The old lock have been put to the bottom. Houses and residents were moved to other settlements. Only the Christmas Church that had been situated on the elevation stayed above the water level.

In 1974, by resolution of RSFSR Council of Ministers, the city of Old Beloozero was put into the category of architectural monuments of Federal Meaning. At the beginning of the 21st century in Vologda Oblast a work on creating museum for Beloozero architectural monument (situated on both banks of Sheksna River in the area of former Krokhino village) has been started.

Nativity Church 

The Nativity Church was built at the end of the 18th century (approximately in 1790) in Krokhino settlement (Belozersky District of Vologda Oblast). The church was at the water's edge on the coast of Lake Beloye, at the origin of the Sheksna River.

At the beginning of the 1960s, Krokhino, Karlugino and other settlements of Belozersky District got into the inundation zone at the time of construction of deep Volga–Baltic Waterway. The level of water in Lake Beloye has risen to guarantee depth for ships, and ancient villages and their whole history have gone underwater. The inhabitants of the inundated areas disassembled their houses and moved away. Only the churches remained on the deserted land: the Nativity Church in Krokhino, more famous for its location, and the Church of Candlemas built at the end of the 18th century in Kovzha (at the mouth of the Kovzha River).

It is known that the Nativity Church was built in the Baroque style (a stone three-altar church with Nikolskiy and Peter-and-Paul chapels). At present both churches are half-destroyed. The Nativity Church is more likely to collapse as it stands in water, and the Church of Candlemas in Kovzha is on an island. In the result of drowning the southern wall of the church in Krokhino is more destroyed than the northern wall.

The Nativity Church in Krokhino became well-known because of the tourist routes that travel on Sheksna River. In 2009, a project to salvage the church was organized.

References

External links 
 https://web.archive.org/web/20120321193540/http://www.krokhino.ru/en/project.html

Rural localities in Belozersky District
Belozersky District, Vologda Oblast